Chloe Csengery (born July 7, 2000) is an American actress known for playing the role of young Katie in the feature films Paranormal Activity 3, Paranormal Activity: The Marked Ones, and Paranormal Activity: The Ghost Dimension.

Early life 
Csengery was born and raised in Houston, Texas. She has an elder sister.

Career 
Csengery began taking acting classes at young age and soon enough landed roles in shows such as Criminal Minds, Parenthood, Up All Night. She also plays Perry Gilbert in the Law & Order: Special Victims Unit episode, "Glasgowman's Wrath".

Filmography

Film

Television

References

External links
 

Actresses from Houston
Living people
American child actresses
American film actresses
American television actresses
21st-century American actresses
2000 births